Widmer Brothers is a brewery founded in 1984 in Portland, Oregon, by brothers Kurt and Robert Widmer. It is part of the Craft Brew Alliance, Inc., the 12th largest brewing company in the United States in 2017.

Details
In 1986, the Widmer Brothers introduced their "Hefeweizen" beer – an American variant on a traditional Hefeweizen, which is usually characterized by distinctive yeast flavors. Instead, the Widmer brew was an unfiltered version of their existing wheat beer (Weizenbier), and used Cascade hops. Subsequently, both this style of "American Hefeweizen" and the custom of serving wheat beer with a slice of lemon have both spread widely.

In November 2007, Redhook Ale Brewery and Widmer Brothers officially announced plans to merge, forming a new company called Craft Brewers Alliance, which was later renamed as Craft Brew Alliance in 2012.  The merged company retained both the Redhook and Widmer brands. The two had already been working closely for several years through a licensing agreement whereby Redhook brewed and distributed Widmer beers on the East Coast.  Anheuser-Busch holds a minority stake of approximately 32% in the company. 

On January 22, 2019, Widmer Brothers Brewing closed its taproom in Portland, Oregon's Eliot neighborhood, after 22 years.

In April 2021, Widmer Brothers unveiled official beers for two of Portland's professional soccer teams. IPA 'Til I Die was created for the Portland Timbers on the occasion of their 2021 MLS season opening on April 18, 2021. Slide Tackle Hazy IPA was created for the Portland Thorns and their home opener on April 9, 2021.

Beers

This is an incomplete listing of Widmer beers, past and present, and their types.

Year-round
Drifter Pale Ale, Pale ale
Drop Top Amber, Amber / Red ale
Hefeweizen, American Wheat ale / Hefeweizen
Upheaval IPA, IPA
Steel Bridge Porter, Porter

Seasonal
Brrr Seasonal Ale, NW red ale
Hefe Berry Lime, Hefeweizen
Deadlift Imperial IPA, Imperial IPA
Hefe Hopfruit
Hefe Twisted Citrus

Limited release

Barrel Aged Brrrbon (Vintage), Winter warmer
Galaxy Hopped Barleywine, Barleywine
Kill Devil Brown Ale, Brown Ale
Raspberry Russian Imperial Stout (Vintage), Russian Imperial Stout
Rotator IPA Series
SXNW: South By Northwest, Spiced ale

References

External links

Sunburn @ BeerNews

 

Beer brewing companies based in Portland, Oregon
American companies established in 1984
1984 establishments in Oregon
Eliot, Portland, Oregon